Seaholme is a suburb in Melbourne, Victoria, Australia,  south-west of Melbourne's Central Business District, located within the City of Hobsons Bay local government area. Seaholme recorded a population of 2,067 at the 2021 census.

The suburb is a bayside enclave within the larger suburb of Altona, bounded in the west by Millers Road and in the north by the Altona Coastal Park.

Seaholme Post Office opened on 2 July 1951 and closed in 1971.

Transport

Train
 Seaholme is home to Seaholme station, which is serviced by trains on the Werribee railway line.

Bus
 Route 411-412: Laverton to Footscray
 Route 944: City to Point Cook (Night Bus Service)

See also
 City of Altona – Seaholme was previously within this former local government area.

References

External links
Cr Tony Briffa, Councillor for Altona and Seaholme
Hobsons Bay Community Online Forum

Suburbs of Melbourne
Suburbs of the City of Hobsons Bay